The Crooked Hearts is a 1972 American made-for-television comedy film starring Rosalind Russell, Douglas Fairbanks Jr. and was directed by Jay Sandrich. The film marked Russell's final acting appearance and was originally broadcast as the ABC Movie of the Week on November 8, 1972.

Plot
Lorita Dorsey is a widow trying to marry rich bachelor, Rex Willoughby, through a lonely hearts club, but her plans fails into a deadly cat-and-mouse game.

Cast
Rosalind Russell as Laurita Dorsey
Douglas Fairbanks Jr. as Rex Willoughby
Ross Martin as Sergeant Daniel Shane
Michael Murphy as Frank Adamic
Maureen O'Sullivan as Lillian Stanton
Kent Smith as James Simpson
Dick Van Patten as Edward—Desk Clerk
Patrick Campbell as Taxi Driver
Liam Dunn as Writer
Penny Marshall as Waitress
Kenneth Tobey as Fisherman

Production
The film was shot over 12 days.

Reception
The New York Times said it was  "pleasant but wears exceedingly thin". The review concludes: "Some viewers probably would settle for outright comedy minus the clanky hanky‐panky, with Miss Russell simply being her rakish, lah‐de‐dah self. This lady's not for murder, she's for winks. And so, at this point, is Mr. Fairbanks, with his vintage courtliness. Miss O'Sullivan, looking like a million, Ross Martin, Michael Murphy and Kent Smith all do well in supporting roles, under Jay Sandrich's smooth direction of an equally smooth script by A. J. Russell. But better a short breeze than a long‐winded teaser."

The Los Angeles Times called it "outstanding". Judith Crist in TV Guide said, "1972's 'The Crooked Hearts' is a better-than-usual tailored-for-television flick, only because the performers--Rosalind Russell, Douglas Fairbanks, Jr. and Maureen O'Sullivan--prove themselves old pors at charming their way through weak material as lonely-hearts racketeers."

References

External links

1972 television films
1972 films
1972 comedy films
Films scored by Billy Goldenberg
American comedy television films
ABC Movie of the Week
1970s English-language films
Films directed by Jay Sandrich
1970s American films